Mohammad Alam may refer to:

 Mohammad Alam (Afghan cricketer) (born 1996), Afghan cricketer
 Mohammad Alam (Pakistani cricketer) (born 1982), Pakistani cricketer
 Mohammad Alam (photojournalist) (died 2008), Bangladeshi photojournalist
 Mohammad Aadil Alam, Nepalese cricketer
 Mohammad Izhar Alam, Indian police official
 Mohammad Sajjad Alam (born 1947), American particle physicist
 Mohammad Shafiul Alam (born 1959), Bangladeshi civil servant